This is a list of the main career statistics of Hungarian tennis player Ágnes Szávay.

Performance timelines
Only main-draw results in WTA Tour, Grand Slam tournaments, Fed Cup and Olympic Games are included in win–loss records.

Singles

Doubles

WTA career finals

Singles: 7 (5 titles, 2 runner–ups)

Doubles: 8 (2 titles, 6 runner–ups)

ITF Circuit finals

Singles: 4 (3 titles, 1 runner–up)

Doubles: 5 (3 titles, 2 runner–ups)

Record against other players

Top 10 wins

Notes

References 

Schnyder, Patty